Springfield School District or Springfield Public Schools may refer to:

Springfield Schools District 186, Sangamon County, Illinois
Springfield Public Schools (Massachusetts), Hampden County, Massachusetts
Springfield Public Schools (Missouri)
Springfield Township School District (New Jersey), Burlington County, New Jersey
Springfield Public Schools (New Jersey), Union County, New Jersey
Springfield City School District, Ohio
Springfield School District (Oregon)
Springfield School District (Delaware County), Pennsylvania
Springfield Township School District, Montgomery County, Pennsylvania

See also 
 Springfield Local School District (disambiguation)